William VII of Hesse-Kassel (21 June 1651 – 21 November 1670) was Landgrave of Hesse-Kassel.

Life 
William was the eldest son of Landgrave William VI of Hesse-Kassel and his wife, Hedwig Sophie of Brandenburg.  William VII inherited the landgraviate when his father died in 1663.  Since he was still a minor, his mother became regent.

William was engaged with his cousin Maria Amalia of Courland, the daughter of Jacob of Courland (her mother was the sister of William's mother).  After the engagement, he embarked on his Grand Tour to the Netherlands, England and France.  In Paris, he became very ill with a "fever".  The French doctors tried to cure the 19-year-old landgrave with laxatives, emetics, enemas and bloodletting, yet the treatment killed him.

He was buried in the Martinskirche, Kassel.  His fiancée married his younger brother and successor, Landgrave Charles.

Ancestry

References 
 Hans Philippi: Die Landgrafschaft Hessen-Kassel 1648–1806, in the series Veröffentlichungen der Historischen Kommission für Hessen, issue 46, also Kleine Schriften, vol. 8, Marburg, 2007.
 Franz Carl Theodor Piderit: Geschichte der Haupt- und Residenzstadt Kassel p. 239
 Kaspar Nöding: Statistik, Topographie und Geschichte des Landgräflich und Kurfürstlichen ... p. 222 f.

|-

Landgraves of Hesse-Kassel
People from the Landgraviate of Hesse-Kassel
1651 births
1670 deaths
Landgraves of Hesse
German Calvinist and Reformed Christians
17th-century German people